The University of New Hampshire (UNH) is a public land-grant research university with its main campus in Durham, New Hampshire.  It was founded and incorporated in 1866 as a land grant college in Hanover in connection with Dartmouth College, moved to Durham in 1893, and adopted its current name in 1923.

The university's Durham campus comprises six colleges. A seventh college, the University of New Hampshire at Manchester, occupies the university's campus in Manchester. The University of New Hampshire School of Law is in Concord, the state's capital. The university is part of the University System of New Hampshire and is classified among "R1: Doctoral Universities – Very high research activity".

, its combined campuses made UNH the largest state university system in the state of New Hampshire, with over 15,000 students. It was also the most expensive state-sponsored school in the United States for in-state students.

History 
 

The Morrill Act of 1862 granted federal lands to New Hampshire for the establishment of an agricultural-mechanical college. In 1866, the university was first incorporated as the New Hampshire College of Agriculture and the Mechanic Arts in Hanover, New Hampshire, in association with Dartmouth College. The institution was officially associated with Dartmouth College and was directed by Dartmouth's president. Durham resident Benjamin Thompson left his farm and assets to the state for the establishment of an agricultural college. On January 30, 1890, Benjamin Thompson died and his will became public. On March 5, 1891, Governor Hiram A. Tuttle signed an act accepting the conditions of Thompson's will. On April 10, 1891, Governor Tuttle signed a bill authorizing the college's move to Durham, New Hampshire.

In 1892, the Board of Trustees hired Charles Eliot to draw a site plan for the first five campus buildings: Thompson, Conant, Nesmith, and Hewitt Shops (now called Halls) and the Dairy Barn. Eliot visited Durham and worked for three months to create a plan prior to the move to Durham. The Class of 1892, excited about the pending move to Durham, held commencement exercises in an unfinished barn on the Durham campus. On April 18, 1892, the Board of Trustees voted to "authorize the faculty to make all the arrangements for the packing and removal of college property at Hanover to Durham." The Class of 1893, followed the previous class and held commencement exercises in unfinished Thompson Hall, the Romanesque Revival campus centerpiece designed by the prominent Concord architectural firm of Dow & Randlett.

In fall 1893, classes officially began in Durham with 51 freshmen and 13 upperclassmen, which was three times the projected enrollment. Graduate study was also established in fall 1893 for the first time. The number of students and the lack of state funds for dormitories caused a housing crunch and forced students to find housing in town. The lack of housing caused difficulty for attracting women to the university. In 1908, construction on Smith Hall, the first women's dorm, was completed using private and state funds. Prior to the construction of Fairchild Hall in 1915 for male students, 50 freshmen lived in the basement of DeMerritt Hall. With the continuing housing shortage for men, the administration encouraged the growth of the UNH Greek system. From the late 1910s through the 1930s, the fraternity system expanded and provided room and board for male students.

In 1919 supervising architect Eric T. Huddleston prepared a master plan for the campus which guided development of the school for the next thirty years. As supervising architect Huddleston is credited with the design of over a dozen campus buildings. In 1923, Governor Fred H. Brown signed a bill changing the name of the college to University of New Hampshire. The university was incorporated on July 1, 1923.

In the spring of 2015, the university was given $4 million from the estate of Robert Morin, who had been a librarian at the university for almost 50 years. Having lived a frugal and secluded life, he allowed for his life's savings to be given to the university without restraint. In 2016, the news that the university was spending $1 million on a new video screen for the football stadium provoked criticism, both on and off campus. Critics thought that the difference between that amount and the $100,000 the university transferred to the library was inappropriate.

Academics

The University of New Hampshire is the flagship of the University System of New Hampshire. UNH is composed of eleven colleges and graduate schools, offering 2,000 courses in over 100 majors. The eight colleges of UNH are:

 College of Engineering and Physical Sciences (CEPS)
 College of Liberal Arts (COLA)
 College of Life Sciences and Agriculture (COLSA)
 Thompson School of Applied Science (TSAS)
 College of Health and Human Services (CHHS)
 University of New Hampshire at Manchester (UNHM)
 UNH Graduate School
 Peter T. Paul College of Business and Economics (PCBE), formerly the Whittemore School of Business and Economics (WSBE)
 University of New Hampshire School of Law
 Carsey School of Public Policy
 School of Marine Science and Ocean Engineering

The university is a member of the New England Board of Higher Education's New England Regional Student Program (NERSP) where New England public universities and colleges offer a number of undergraduate curricula with special considerations to students from other New England states. If an out-of-state student's home state school does not offer a certain degree program offered by UNH, that student can receive the in-state tuition rate, plus 75 percent if enrolled in the program.

The Thompson School of Applied Science (TSAS), first established in 1895 and now a division of COLSA, confers an associate degree in applied science in seven different programs: Applied Animal Science, Forest Technology, and Veterinary technology. Four other degree programs were discontinued in spring of 2018.

The coastal proximity of the university affords excellent programs in marine biology and oceanography. Facilities include the Jackson Estuarine Laboratory at Adams Point in Durham, and the Shoals Marine Laboratory jointly operated with Cornell University on Appledore Island in the Isles of Shoals.

The University of New Hampshire Observatory is operated by the Department of Physics for educational purposes.

There are three main university-wide undergraduate research programs: Undergraduate Research Opportunities Program (UROP), Undergraduate Research Fellowship (SURF), and International Research Opportunities Program (IROP).

The university offers many opportunities for students to study abroad through managed programs, exchange programs and approved programs. The university runs/manages 22 study abroad programs in locations which include Cambridge, England; London, England; Edinburgh, Scotland; Brest, France; Dijon, France; Grenoble, France; Budapest, Hungary; Osaka, Japan; Utrecht, Netherlands; Maastricht, Netherlands; Ascoli Piceno, Italy; New Zealand; India; South Africa; Kenya; and Granada, Spain. The university also accepts credit from over 300 approved programs that are run through other institutions.  The university organizes an annual summer abroad program at Gonville and Caius College, Cambridge University.  There are also over 100 National Exchange Program opportunities.

In 2010, the Franklin Pierce Law Center in Concord was incorporated into the University of New Hampshire System and renamed the University of New Hampshire School of Law. It is the only law school in the state of New Hampshire. The School of Law offers Juris Doctor degrees in addition to graduate studies in Intellectual Property and Commerce & Technology. The University of New Hampshire Law School is renowned for its intellectual property law programs, consistently ranking in the top ten of U.S. News & World Report rankings. In 2012, it was ranked 4th behind the University of California at Berkeley, Stanford University and George Washington University.

The Peter T. Paul College of Business and Economics building was opened for occupancy in January 2013. Formerly the Whittemore School of Business and Economics (WSBE), the Paul School offers degrees in Business Administration (featuring focuses in Accounting, Entrepreneurial Venture Creation, Finance, Information Systems Management, International Business and Economics, Management, and Marketing), Hospitality, and Economics (either in B.A. or B.S).

As of the 2015 fall semester, the university had 12,840 undergraduate students and 2,500 graduate students enrolled in more than 200 majors. The student body comprises 47% in-state students, 49% out-of-state students, and 4% international students; and is 54% female and 46% male.

Admissions 

Admission to UNH is rated as "selective" by U.S. News & World Report.

UNH received 18,040 applications for admission to the Fall 2019 incoming freshman class; 15,159 were admitted (an acceptance rate of 84.0%), and 2,731 enrolled.  The middle 50% range of enrolled freshmen SAT scores was 1080-1260 for the composite, 540-640 for evidence-based reading and writing, and 530-630 for math, while the ACT composite middle 50% range was 22–28.

Rankings

U.S. News & World Report ranks New Hampshire tied for 143rd among 389 "national universities" and tied for 65th out of 209 "top public schools" in 2021. The University of New Hampshire is accredited by the New England Commission of Higher Education.

In 2012, the Department of Education ranked the University of New Hampshire as having the sixth most expensive in-state tuition for a public four-year college. The University of New Hampshire ranks lowest in the country for the amount of subsidy it receives from the state.

Money magazine ranked the University of New Hampshire 117th out of 744 in its "Best Colleges For Your Money 2019" report.

Research
The university is classified among "R1: Doctoral Universities – Very high research activity". According to the National Science Foundation, UNH spent $146 million on research and development in 2018, ranking it 137th in the nation.

University library
The University Library consists of the main Dimond Library and three science libraries specializing in chemistry, physics, and computer science, mathematics, and engineering.  One enters The Dimond Library on the third floor. It has three quiet study reading rooms, seating for 1,200, Zeke's Café, and the Dimond Academic Commons (DAC), in which is offered computer workstations, IT help, the Connors Writing Center, Geospatial Information Services Center, and research help. Other areas of the library provide access to media equipment, collaborative work spaces, and laptop ports.

The Parker Media Lab (PML) is an interdisciplinary audio and visual self-service recording space located in the Dimond Library. The PML was designed to support the creation of professional, academically focused content and is available for use by any University of New Hampshire (UNH) student, staff, or faculty member. The space includes:
A One Button Studio for video recording, complete with a camera, audio equipment, and lights;
A Lightboard (transparent whiteboard), to support presentations and content delivery;
A Mac computer with advanced editing capabilities;
A Whisper Room (sound isolation studio) with two professional quality microphones and headsets.
The Parker Media Lab (PML) is located on the second floor of the Dimond Library, room 237. It is available for self-service use during all Dimond Library operating hours.

The Chemistry Library (Parsons Hall), the Engineering/Mathematics/Computer Science Library (Kingsbury Hall), and the Physics Library (DeMeritt Hall) offer customized service for the UNH scientific and engineering communities. Each science library offers specialized reference assistance, reserve materials, reference and circulating collections, periodicals, and electronic resources specific to their fields.  All science libraries provide WiFi and laptop ports, laptops and computer workstations, as well as other equipment.  Parsons, DeMeritt and Kingsbury Libraries have group meeting rooms that students may reserve; all have collaborative as well as quiet areas.

In addition to more than 2 million volumes and 50,000 periodical subscriptions, the library has an extensive government documents collection, maps, sound recordings, CDs, videos, DVDs, and a Special Collections and Archives section with rare books, manuscripts, and University publications and papers. The library offers extensive electronic resources including e-books, digital collections, indexes in many subject areas, statistical data sets and databases supplying full-text periodical and newspaper articles.

University of New Hampshire InterOperability Laboratory (UNH-IOL)
Students and staff, mainly belonging to majors of Electrical Engineering, Computer Engineering, and Computer Science students work at the UNH InterOperability Laboratory, which tests networking and data communication devices and products.  The UNH-IOL interviews and accepts applications from students of all majors and varying backgrounds of job experience and expertise.

More than 100 graduate and undergraduate student employees work with full-time UNH-IOL staff, gaining hands-on experience with developing technologies and products. The companies and organizations that work with the UNH-IOL benefit from cost-effective testing services, as well as the opportunity to recruit future engineers from the UNH-IOL workforce.

Carsey School of Public Policy
The Carsey School of Public Policy at the University of New Hampshire conducts policy research on vulnerable children, youth, and families and on sustainable community development. They give policy makers and practitioners the timely, independent resources they need to effect change in their communities.

Student demographics

Geographic origin (domestic)

Student life
The university has about 250 student organizations grouped by academics and careers, community service, political and world affairs, arts and entertainment, culture and language, fraternities and sororities, hall councils, honor societies, leisure and recreation, media and publications, religious, special interest, and student activism. Recreation at the University of New Hampshire also includes club and intramural sports. Student activities are largely funded by a Student Activity Fee, set in 2017 at $89 per year for full-time undergraduate students.

The use and control of the Student Activity Fee are given by the University System of New Hampshire Board of Trustees to the Student Senate, and one of its subcommittees, the Student Activity Fee Committee (SAFC). SAFC provides support to 200+ organizations, but directly funds 11 organizations as follows: Campus Activities Board, Diversity Support Coalition, Mask and Dagger Dramatic Society, Meeple Tabletop Gaming Syndicate, New Hampshire Outing Club, Organic Gardening Club, Student Committee on Popular Entertainment (SCOPE), The New Hampshire, Slow Food, 91.3 fm WUNH, and the Student Senate. Each organization has a Business Manager position that attends SAFC Meetings.

The Campus Activities Board, collaborates with other student organizations to provide programming for students by students. They plan various recreational activities for the student body.

The Diversity Support Coalition's mission is to support multiculturalism, diversity, and equality at UNH. It hosts 6 member groups, Alliance, the Black Student Union, Hillel, Mosaico, the Native American Cultural Association, and the United Asian Coalition.

Mask and Dagger Dramatic Society is UNH's student run traditional theatre organization. They produce full length musicals and plays.

Meeple's goal is to support friendly social interaction through the playing of board, card, and role-playing games including Magic: The Gathering and Dungeons and Dragons.

The New Hampshire Outing Club or NHOC, is the oldest and largest club on campus, offering outdoor focused trips on most weekends. They offer unique leadership and certification opportunities, training a minimum of 40 trip leaders per year.

The Organic Gardening Club grows produce on campus with the goal of creating a community and maintaining a certified organic farm while promoting sustainable living and growing.

SCOPE works to bring live, nationally recognized talent to the university including concerts, comedy shows, and virtual meet and greets offered at a decreased rate for students.

The New Hampshire (commonly referred to as TNH) is a weekly student-run newspaper headquartered at the University of New Hampshire. Since 1911, it has been published weekly on Thursdays during the academic year, with a printed circulation of 3,000 copies per issue. TNH is distributed for free in the Memorial Union Building, university housing and academic buildings, Durham businesses, and other locations around the southern New Hampshire seacoast area; the newspaper also publishes an online edition of the week's print edition. TNH is the oldest UNH publication still in operation; The Granite student yearbook, the oldest university publication on record, ran from 1908 to 2017.

Slow Food aims to promote the opposite of fast food, building a community around the idea of "Good, Clean, and Fair". educating students about sustainable, seasonal diets and fair food production.

WUNH, also known as the Freewaves or the Seacoast Sound Alternative, is a fully functional non-commercial radio station focused on alternative broadcasting. 91.3 fm on your dial is FCC certified and can be streamed via wunh.org. They provide students and community members an opportunity to participate in all aspects of radio operation and production. They have a wide range of specify programming, sports, and news shows. All DJs run a program including 60% new music (dropped in the last three months) in each show.

Student Senate is a student governance organization of which SAFC is a subcommittee. They aim to serve as advocates for the UNH undergraduate student body.

Student government
The Student Senate of the University of New Hampshire is the on-campus, undergraduate student government. The Student Senate controls the use of its own student activity fee, and directly governs student organizations that receive a regular, annual budget from it. The Student Senate also formulates student stances on University policy, and attempts to lobby its position to administrators and the local and state government. According to its Constitution, the Student Senate "[serves] as an advocate for all undergraduate students, deriving its power from the consent of the governed and developed on the principle that all undergraduate students of the University of New Hampshire have the right to participate in its governance. Such participation encourages the development of student expertise in University affairs and places significant responsibility on students for their involvement with the policies, rules, and regulations which affect the quality of education and the experience of students at the University of New Hampshire." The Student Senate at UNH is noted for being one of the few remaining student governments in the United States that are free of a faculty or staff advisor.

The Graduate Student Senate (GSS) represents all graduate students at UNH, with senators elected from all colleges (College of Engineering & Physical Sciences, College of Liberal Arts, College of Life Sciences & Agriculture, College of Health & Human Sciences, Paul College of Business & Economics) as well as from the Graduate School and graduate housing. The executive committee, composed of 6-7 members, includes a President, Vice President, Communications Officer, Financial Affairs Officer, External Affairs Officer, and Community Coordinator, with the most recent Past President serving at the discretion of the current President. Senators and executive committee members serve on both internal and external committees, maintaining ties with other student organizations, as well as with the faculty and administration, in order to gather information and act on behalf of graduate student interests. GSS representation, elections, and other functions are governed by the UNH Graduate Student Senate Constitution & Bylaws.

Fraternity and sorority life

Approximately 15% of undergraduate students are affiliated with fraternities and sororities recognized by the university. The Office of Student Involvement and Leadership, the Inter-fraternity Council (IFC) and Panhellenic Council (Panhel) oversee the 13 recognized social fraternities and eight recognized social sororities. Many of the fraternities and sororities have houses on Madbury Road and Strafford Avenue in Durham. These houses are not owned by or on university property. In addition, several unrecognized fraternities continue their operations despite derecognition from the university.

The school's first fraternity was Zeta Epsilon Zeta, which was established in 1894. In March 1917, it became a chapter of Sigma Alpha Epsilon.

Underrepresented students

Elizabeth Virgil
The first African-American graduate of the University of New Hampshire was Elizabeth Virgil, who graduated in 1926 with a bachelor's degree in Home Economics. She was from the nearby town of Portsmouth, New Hampshire, and attended college at the urging of her mother, Alberta Curry Virgil, a housekeeper. Virgil later founded a scholarship in her mother's memory.

Current Demographics
According to College Factual's 2021 Diversity Report 9,849 undergraduates were white, 419 Hispanic, 339 Asian, 255 multi-ethnic, 125 Black or African-American, and 1 pacific Islander. The race of an additional 542 was unknown and 417 international students were not counted in the survey. Among graduate students, 1,031 were white, 35 Hispanic, 26 Black or African American, 24 Asian, 15 multi-ethnic, and 1 pacific islander. The races of 41 graduate students were unknown and an additional 277 were international and not counted in the survey.

Student organizations

The student-led Diversity Support Coalition (DSC) aims to offer resources to groups "affected by institutionalized oppression based on race, ethnicity, sexual orientation, sex, gender identity and expression, age, ability, native language, national origin, and/or religion at UNH."

The DSC promotes, educates, and supports multiculturalism, diversity, and equality at UNH through programming efforts and support of the six student organizations within the DSC. The six member groups are Alliance, the Black Student Union, Hillel, Mosaico, the Native American Cultural Association, and the United Asian Coalition. Participation in the DSC is open to all UNH students. The DSC encourages student organizations with similar needs to be recognized under the Diversity Support Coalition by submitting a petition within the guidelines for the DSC constitution. The total membership of the DSC is 200 individuals.

In addition to the six organizations within the DSC, UNH students run over a dozen groups for the purpose of multiculturalism and peer reference groups. Groups include women in professional fields, country or geographic specific cultural clubs, and international student clubs.

Multiple organizations on campus are focused on providing women in professional fields access to relational and ideational resources promoting success. Women-focused groups on campus include Her Campus, UNH Data Driven Women, Women in Business, the Society of Woman Engineers, and Women in Science.

Culturally focused groups on campus include the Desi Student Association, Japanese Cultural Club, Indonesian Student Association, International Student Organization, Middle Eastern Cultural Association, Russian Cultural Club and Vietnamese Student Association. These groups often host events to educate the student body on their cultures and to welcome experts of ancestral crafts. Conversely, the Committee on Rights and Justice (CORAJ) partners UNH students with local immigrant families, helping them with the naturalization process.

International students 
The university instituted the Navitas program in 2011 to expand the amount of international students at the school. This expanded over the years into the Global Student Success Program (GSSP). The GSSP, in cooperation with the Office of International Students and Scholars (OISS), gives students the support to "help discover opportunities at UNH to immerse in American culture and share your own traditions with others from the U.S. and from around the globe." The programs guide students through the application process and the extent of their career.

During fall 2015, UNH enrolled 298 students from 34 countries. The most common countries of origin at that time were the People's Republic of China, Canada, and Vietnam.

The school offers intensive English language education for students through the ESL Institute. As well as advancing students' knowledge of English as a second language, one of the goals of the ESL Institute is "to provide students with the cultural knowledge and awareness needed to function satisfactorily, both academically and socially, in the United States."

First-generation college students
Begun in 1994, UNH Connect is a program where first-generation college students and multicultural students are given a jump-start to the experiences of college life with a summer pre-orientation program aimed at social connection and comfortability with college life. Each student is assigned a peer mentor who helps with the transition to their freshman year. The program, with 100 students in 2014, also gives first-generation students an opportunity to meet people in similar situations prior to the beginning of college.

The Center for Academic Resources (CFAR) offers a program called TRIO that is partially funded by the US Department of Education. TRIO is intended for students who are first-generation, have a disability, or are in extreme financial need. Through the TRIO program students can receive services to help understand options for future careers as well as advice with financial aspects of college that they would most likely not have home support with. These include academic tutoring, assistance with student loans, scholarship advice, individual counseling, and career planning. In the 2017–18 school year the UNH TRIO program was funded for 200 students.

Music
The University of New Hampshire offers two undergraduate degree programs: the Bachelor of Arts in music and the Bachelor of Music; and two graduate degree programs: the Master of Arts in music (concentrations in composition, conducting, and musicology), and the Master of Arts in teaching.

The Department of Music offers several performing ensembles, some by audition and others with open enrollment. All UNH students are eligible for membership in all of the ensembles. There is one Symphony Orchestra, three concert bands (Wind Symphony, Symphonic Band, and Concert Band), a large Concert Choir, an auditioned choir (Chamber Singers), two jazz bands, Vocal Arts Project, Wildcat Marching Band, Beast of the East Pep Band, and numerous chamber ensembles and jazz combos. Between the various ensembles, Faculty Concert Series, Traditional Jazz Series, student recitals, and guest artists, the Department of Music puts on a great many performances every year that are open to the public. Additionally, many outreach programs and events are offered, including the Summer Youth Music School (SYMS), UNH Youth Symphony Orchestra, New Hampshire Youth Band, Piano Extension Program, Clark Terry UNH Jazz Festival, UNH Choral Gala, Double Reed Day, UNH Band Extravaganza, and more.

Athletics

The school's athletic teams are the Wildcats, and they compete in the NCAA Division I. New Hampshire is a member of the America East Conference for basketball, cross country, track and field, soccer, swimming & diving and tennis; and women's lacrosse, crew, field hockey, and volleyball. The women's gymnastics program competes in the Eastern Atlantic Gymnastics League at the Division I level. They also compete in Hockey East in men's and women's ice hockey, Eastern Collegiate Ski Association for skiing, as well as the Colonial Athletic Association for football at the Football Championship Subdivision (FCS, formerly known as Division I-AA) level.

The university's colors are white and blue, and its mascots are two wildcats known popularly around campus as Wild E. Cat and Gnarlz. The introduction of a wildcat as a mascot came in 1926; it has had a plethora of different names and even forms throughout the campus' history. In 2000 Wild E. Cat was introduced, followed by Gnarlz in 2008.

In the 2006 academic year the university cut women's crew, men's swimming & diving, and men's and women's tennis at the varsity level, and trimmed the size of the men's ski team from 27 to 12. In 2013, the men's alpine team placed second  at the NCAA championships. The reason given was that the athletic department would save $500,000 towards a $1 million budget shortfall and be in compliance with Title IX for the first time. In 1997, the university cut baseball, softball, men's and women's golf, and men's lacrosse.

In addition to varsity athletics, the university offers many club sports through the Department of Campus Recreation, including aikido, archery, baseball, crew, cycling, dance, fencing, figure skating, golf, men's lacrosse, Nordic skiing, rugby, sailing, softball, tennis, taekwondo, men and women's ultimate Frisbee, wrestling, and the Woodsmen Club. Many of these clubs compete either on an intercollegiate basis with New England teams, or sponsor university tournaments and frequently participate in national championships. UNH also offers horseback riding as a recreation. Many students can take horseback riding lessons with instructors, on their horse or the schools. UNH holds many events each year, for they have a large cross country course. UNH also has a dressage team and a hunt seat team that competes yearly.

The recognized fight song of UNH is "On to Victory", the most current version of which was arranged by Tom Keck, Director of Athletic Bands from 1998 to 2003. In 2003, "UNH Cheer" (originally titled "Cheer Boys") was resurrected from the university archives by Erika Svanoe, Director of Athletic Bands from 2003 to 2006. Based on the school song "Old New Hampshire", not to be confused with the New Hampshire state song of the same name, "UNH Cheer" currently serves as a secondary fight song and is often performed immediately following "On to Victory".

On October 7, 2006, Wildcats wide receiver David Ball tallied the 51st receiving touchdown of his career to displace Jerry Rice of Mississippi Valley State University, who was inducted into the College Football Hall of Fame a month earlier, atop the ranking of NCAA Division I and I-AA players by career receiving touchdowns. He later signed as a rookie free agent with the Chicago Bears and played with well-known college football players Chris Leak and Darius Walker.

Durham campus
The University of New Hampshire is located in the town of Durham, a rural small town on the Amtrak line to Boston. The campus core is considered to be the university property within a 10-minute walk from Thompson Hall, the symbolic and near-geographic center of campus. The campus core contains many of the academic and residential buildings, while the outer campus contains much of the agriculture land and buildings. For the 2020–2021 school year, in order to go on campus students were required to self-test twice weekly to enter campus buildings and use the university's buses.

Housing

As of 2006, the university housed 55% of all undergraduate students. While not required to live on campus freshman year, students are strongly encouraged to; as of the fall 2020 semester about 96% of incoming freshmen chose to live on campus, and over 70% of returning sophomores did as well.

The university offers students a choice of traditional dorm rooms, suites, and on-campus apartments. The university's Campus Master Plan envisions housing about 60% of undergraduates, requiring an addition of 1700 beds. However, the state of New Hampshire does not provide funding for non-academically related buildings, including dormitories.

Undergraduate housing is divided into three areas: The Hills, The Valley and The Timbers (formerly Area I, Area II and Area III, respectively). There are also two undergraduate apartment complexes, The Gables and Woodside Apartments. The university offers graduate housing in Babcock Hall. The second oldest dorm on campus is Hetzel Hall, named after the university's former president Ralph D. Hetzel. Built in 1925, it is located near downtown Durham.

Several of the university's dormitories have specific themes, including a substance-free dormitory, an international dormitory, and several first year-only dormitories. In addition, many buildings have designated quiet floors for study.

For the fall 2006 semester, two new buildings at The Gables ("North" and "South") were opened, providing an additional 400 beds. In summer 2006, one-half of Forest Park was demolished to make way for two new buildings (A & B) of the Southeast Residential Community (SERC). Buildings SERC A and SERC B have provided housing for 492 students since fall 2007. In summer 2020 the Forest Park apartments were demolished in order to make way for more on-campus housing. Two existing mini-dorms were demolished during summer 2007 (leaving four mini-dorms) to construct a third building, SERC C, which has provided housing for 235 students since fall 2008. SERC A, B, and C are now referred to as Handler, Peterson, and Haaland Hall. Plans exist to provide 781 new beds by demolishing the remaining nine buildings (98 units) in Forest Park. Later plans call for the construction of a new 170-unit graduate housing facility at a location to be determined.

Due to the over-enrollment of the 2006–2007 academic year, the university offered students who intended to live in campus housing a free parking pass for the academic year, credit in UNH "Dining Dollars" and a refund of the housing deposit given that the student withdrew their intentions to live on campus. The incentive was designed to free up space for the large incoming freshman class.

Stoke Hall is the largest residence building on campus. It houses over 700 undergraduate students.

In 2015, UNH installed life-saving automated external defibrillators in two fraternity houses.

Manchester campus

As of March 2015, University of New Hampshire at Manchester is located in the  Pandora Mill at 88 Commercial Street, on the banks of the Merrimack River in Manchester's historic Amoskeag Millyard. The move to 88 Commercial Street increased the physical plant of the college by almost 50%, as from 2001 to 2014 the school was located in the  University Center building at 400 Commercial Street.

Concord Campus 
The University of New Hampshire Franklin Pierce School of Law is a located in Concord, New Hampshire. It was founded in 1973 by Robert H. Rines as the Franklin Pierce Law Center, and operated independently until 2010, when it was formally incorporated to be a part of the University of New Hampshire.

National Historic Chemical Landmark 
Conant Hall was dedicated as a National Historical Chemical Landmark—the first in New Hampshire. Conant Hall was the first chemistry building on the Durham campus, and it was the headquarters of the American Chemical Society from 1907 to 1911, when Charles Parsons was the society's secretary. In addition, from 1906 to 1928, the hall housed the laboratories of Charles James, who was an innovative developer of separation and analytical methods for compounds of rare earth elements. James Hall, the second chemistry building on campus, was named for Charles James.

Notable alumni

Notable alumni of the University of New Hampshire include world-renowned author John Irving (B.A. 1965), National Book Award-winning author Alice McDermott (M.A. 1968), filmmaker Jennifer Lee (B.A. 1992) and several former governors of the state of New Hampshire, including John Lynch, the 80th governor of the state from 2005-2013. Joan Ferrini-Mundy is the current president of the University of Maine.

Notable faculty
 John Aber, professor of natural resources and the environment, notable ecologist, author
 Grant Drumheller, painter, professor of art
 Meredith Hall (b. 1949), author of The New York Times bestseller Without a Map, lecturer of English
 Jochen Heisenberg (b. 1939), professor emeritus of physics, son of famed German physicist and Nobel laureate Werner Heisenberg
 Charles James (chemist) (1880–1928), among the discoverers of the element lutetium  
 Rochelle Lieber, linguist, professor of linguistics
 John D. Mayer, professor of psychology, co-developer of Mayer-Salovey-Caruso Emotional Intelligence Test (MSCEIT) and notable author and expert on personality psychology
 Joshua Meyrowitz (b. 1949), author of No Sense of Place, professor emeritus of communication
 Robert Morin (1938–2015), Dimond Library cataloger who donated his $4 million estate to the university
 Donald Murray (1924–2006), Pulitzer Prize-winning journalist, professor emeritus of English
 Chanda Prescod-Weinstein, cosmologist and activist, professor of physics and women's studies
 Lori Robinson (c. 1959), general in the USAF, first female commander of North American Aerospace Defense Command (NORAD)
 Lucy E. Salyer, historian of American immigration law
 Edwin Scheier (1910–2008), sculptor, fine art professor emeritus
 Mary Scheier (1908–2007),  sculptor, artist-in-residence emeritus
 Charles Simic (b. 1938), Pulitzer Prize-winning poet, professor of English, U.S. Poet Laureate (2007–08)
 Murray A. Straus (1926–2016), sociologist and professor, creator of the Conflict tactics scale
 Clark Terry (1920–2015), jazz trumpeter, affiliate faculty, Department of Music (1988-2015)
Laurel Thatcher Ulrich (b. 1938), professor of history at the University of New Hampshire 1980-1995
 Stacy D. VanDeveer (b. 1967), political scientist, professor of political science and chair of the Department of Political Science
 Yitang Zhang (b. 1955), number theorist, professor of mathematics, MacArthur Fellow

Campus sites of interest
 Durham–UNH station, historic train depot, home of UNH Dairy Bar
 Jesse Hepler Lilac Arboretum
 UNH Museum of Art
 Whittemore Center, home to UNH Wildcat men's and women's hockey. Capacity is 6,501 for sporting events, 7,500 for concerts and other events.
 Lundholm Gym, home to UNH Wildcat men's and women's basketball and women's gymnastics
 Wildcat Stadium, home to UNH Wildcat football
 Thompson Hall, first structural home of the University of New Hampshire
 Memorial Union Building (MUB)
 University of New Hampshire Observatory

See also 

 UNH Alma Mater

References

External links

 
  of the University of New Hampshire Athletics

 
Educational institutions established in 1866
Land-grant universities and colleges
University System of New Hampshire
Forestry education
Educational buildings in Manchester, New Hampshire
Universities and colleges in Hillsborough County, New Hampshire
Universities and colleges in Strafford County, New Hampshire
Flagship universities in the United States
1866 establishments in New Hampshire
University of New Hampshire